Wang Yajun (born December 1969) is a Chinese diplomat who is the current Chinese Ambassador to North Korea, in office since December 2021.

Biography
Wang was born in Anhui in December 1969. He graduated from China Foreign Affairs University. He joined the Chinese Communist Party in July 1991. He joined the Foreign Service in June 1995 and has served primarily in Europe. In July 2015, he became director of the Department of Policy Planning of the Ministry of Foreign Affairs, but having held the position for only one year, then he took office as assistant minister of the International Liaison Department of the Chinese Communist Party. In December 2021, he was appointed Chinese Ambassador to North Korea according the National People's Congress decision, succeeding Li Jinjun.

References

1969 births
Living people
People from Anhui
China Foreign Affairs University alumni
Diplomats of the People's Republic of China
Ambassadors of China to North Korea